Thomas Clarke is a British and Australian Research Professor at the University of Technology Sydney. A Fellow of the Royal Society of Arts, he served as founder and Director of the UTS Centre for Corporate Governance Research Centre (2003-2016), and recently serves as core member of the UTS Centre for Business and Social Innovation (CBSI). Previously he was Head of School of Management at UTS, Chair of UTS Academic Board 2009-2010 and a member of the UTS University Council during this period.

Research
As Director of the Key University Research Centre for Corporate Governance at UTS, he led a large inter-disciplinary team of researchers examining international comparative corporate governance.  This includes the financial aspects of corporate governance, directors’ duties and the role of the board, and legal and ethical aspects of governance, international comparative corporate governance, integrated reporting, corporate social and environmental responsibility and sustainability. He is interested in the critique of shareholder value and the relationship of governance to strategy, innovation, and sustainable value creation.

His broader research interests on which he has published widely include innovation and the knowledge economy, management and business paradigms; globalisation; international best practice in knowledge management; the knowledge economy; privatization and deregulation; management reform in China and SE Asia; sustainable enterprise; stakeholder management; media and communications; new organizational forms; and the governance of knowledge-based business.

Selected publications 

 Clarke, T., O’Brien, J., and O’Kelley, C. (2018) The Oxford Handbook of the Corporation, Oxford University Press
 Clarke, T. and Lee, K. (2018) Innovation in the Asia Pacific: From Manufacturing to Knowledge Economy, Singapore: Springer
 Clarke, T. and Klettner, A. (2018) The Global Financial Crisis and the Regulatory Response, Cambridge University Press (Forthcoming).
 Clarke, T. (2017) International Corporate Governance: A Comparative Approach ,London and New York: Routledge
 Clarke, T. and Branson, D. (2012) Handbook of Corporate Governance, London: Sage
 Clarke, T. and Chanlat, J-F. (2009) European Corporate Governance, London and New York: Routledge
 Clarke, T. (2005) Critical Perspectives in Business and Management: Corporate Governance Set Volumes 1-5, London: Routledge
 Clarke, T., and dela Rama, M., (2006) Corporate Governance and Globalisation – Set Volume 1-3, London: Sage
 Clarke, T. (2004) Theories of Governance: The Philosophical Foundations of Corporate Governance, London: Routledge
 Clarke T. and Clegg, S. (2000) Changing Paradigms: The Transformation of Management Knowledge for the 21st Century, London: Harper Collins
 Clare, T. and E. Monkhouse, (1994) Rethinking the Company, Financial Times-Pitman
 Clarke, T. and C. Pitelis, (2005) The Political Economy of Privatisation, Routledge, London
 Clarke, T., (1994)  International Privatisation: Strategies and Practices, Berlin: Walter de Gruyter

References

External links 
 

Living people
Academic staff of the University of Technology Sydney
Year of birth missing (living people)
Academics from Liverpool
Alumni of Warwick Business School
Alumni of the University of Birmingham